Theodore Grant Gray  (31 January 1884 – 8 September 1964) was a New Zealand psychiatrist and mental health administrator. He was born in Aberdeen, Aberdeenshire, Scotland, on 31 January 1884.

In the 1938 New Year Honours, Gray was appointed a Companion of the Order of St Michael and St George.

References

1884 births
1964 deaths
Scientists from Aberdeen
New Zealand psychiatrists
Scottish emigrants to New Zealand
20th-century New Zealand medical doctors
New Zealand Companions of the Order of St Michael and St George